Simon Dore (born 30 July 1969) is a retired professional kickboxer from Leicester, England. Dore was a former World Kickboxing Network (WKN) world heavyweight kickboxing champion who fought most of his career under 'full-contact' rules but would also compete under 'free-style' (low kicks) rules and fought twice in K-1.

Biography/Career
Simon Dore began his career fighting under full-contact rules eventually winning the World Association of Kickboxing Organizations (WAKO) pro Commonwealth super-cruiserweight title. On 20 June 1998, Dore upset Brazilian ISKA world champion Eduardo Canuto by split decision in Bangor, Northern Ireland.
 On 6 February 1999, Dore lost to South African Sheldon Schutzler by decision in a freestyle bout held in Belfast, Northern Ireland. This was Dore's first bout under low kick rules. Shortly afterwards Dore captured the WKN world heavyweight title under low kick rules on 28 April 1999 in a re-match against Eduardo Canuto in Alagoas, Brazil.

On 6 June 1999, Simon Dore fought Hiromi Amada at K-1: Survival '99 in Sapporo, Japan, losing by TKO at 1:55 of round 3. Then on 31 October 1999 in Leicester, England, Simon Dore re-matched Sheldon Schutzler who was now the WKN Intercontinental heavyweight Thai boxing champion. Dore won the bout by unanimous decision after 5 rounds. Dore had his second K-1 bout on 16 April 2000 at K-1: UK Battle of Britain 2000 in Birmingham, England against UK MMA pioneer Lee Hasdell. Dore lost by KO at 0:30 of round 3.

Ranked No.1 in the world, Dore travelled to Lake Grove, New York on 16 November 2001 to take on the USKBA world super-heavyweight full-contact champion Derek Panza (17-1). This was also for the vacant ISKA world super-heavyweight full-contact title. Dore took Panza the full 12 rounds, losing by decision. Dore had a shot at the WAKO pro world heavyweight full-contact title when he fought Aziz Katou in Leicester, losing by 8th-round KO.

Kickboxing titles
 WAKO pro Commonwealth super-cruiserweight full-contact champion.
 WKN world heavyweight kickboxing (low kicks) champion.

Kickboxing record (incomplete)

|-
|-  bgcolor="#CCFFCC"
| 26-10-2003|| Win ||align=left| Cipher Shagaam  || Fight Night @ Starlite|| Leicester, England || Decision ||  || 
|-
|-  bgcolor="#CCFFCC"
| 25-06-2003|| Win ||align=left| Chris Ballard  || Extreme Brawl 3 || Bracknell, England || DQ || 1 || 
|-
|-  bgcolor="#CCFFCC"
| 11-05-2003|| Win ||align=left| Rob Gledgehill  || || Leicester, England || ||  || 
|-
|-  bgcolor="#FFBBBB"
| 03-11-2002 || Loss ||align=left| Aziz Khatou || Kickboxing Heavyweight Explosion || Leicester, England || KO (head kick) || 8 || 
|-
! style=background:white colspan=9 |
|-
|-  bgcolor="#CCFFCC"
| 05-10-2002|| Win ||align=left| Roger Toone  || || Guildford, England || Decision ||  || 
|-
|-  bgcolor="#FFBBBB"
| 16-11-2001 || Loss ||align=left| Derek Panza || Top Kick Championship Kickboxing || Lake Grove, New York, United States || Decision || 12 || 2:00 
|-
! style=background:white colspan=9 |
|-
|-  bgcolor="#FFBBBB"
| 23-09-2000 || Loss ||align=left| Stan Longinidis || Greek Fight Night || Kozani, Greece || KO || 1 ||  
|-
|-  bgcolor="#FFBBBB"
| 16-04-2000 || Loss ||align=left| Lee Hasdell || K-1: UK Battle of Britain 2000 || Birmingham, England || KO (flying knee) || 3 || 0:30 
|-
|-  bgcolor="#CCFFCC"
| 31-10-1999 || Win ||align=left| Sheldon Schutzler  || Fright Night || Leicester, England || Decision || 5 || 2:00
|-
|-  bgcolor="#FFBBBB"
| 06-06-1999 || Loss ||align=left| Hiromi Amada || K-1: Survival '99 || Sapporo, Japan || TKO || 3 || 1:55    
|-
|-  bgcolor="#CCFFCC"
| 28-04-1999 || Win ||align=left| Eduardo Canuto || IVC 10 || Alagoas, Brazil || || ||
|-
! style=background:white colspan=9 |
|-
|-  bgcolor="#FFBBBB"
| 06-02-1999 || Loss ||align=left| Sheldon Schutzler ||  Championship Kickboxing || Belfast, Northern Ireland || Decision || 5 || 2:00   
|-
|-  bgcolor="#CCFFCC"
| 20-06-1998 || Win ||align=left| Eduardo Canuto || Kickboxing Mania II || Bangor, Northern Ireland || Split decision || 5 || 2:00
|-
|-  bgcolor="#CCFFCC"
| 00-00-0000 || Win ||align=left| Mack McNulty|| || Birmingham, England ||KO || ||
|-  bgcolor="#FFBBBB"
| 11-05-1997 || Loss ||align=left| Wayne Turner || || Dudley, England || Decision || 7 || 2:00 
|-
! style=background:white colspan=9 |
|-
| colspan=9 | Legend:

See also 
List of K-1 events
List of male kickboxers

References

English male kickboxers
1969 births
Living people
Sportspeople from Leicester